Rockaway Boulevard is a major road in the New York City borough of Queens. Unlike the similarly named Rockaway Beach Boulevard and Rockaway Freeway, it serves mainland Queens and does not enter the Rockaways.

Route description
It begins as an undivided road at Eldert Lane, a small one-way street that runs along the border between Queens and Brooklyn. West of Atlantic Avenue, it is a two-lane road. When it crosses Atlantic Avenue, it widens to four lanes.

Rockaway Boulevard generally runs east-southeast. It crosses the Van Wyck Expressway (I-678) and the Belt Parkway. Just south of the parkway, the Queens segment of the Nassau Expressway (NY 878) ends at Rockaway Boulevard, in a Y-shaped, at-grade junction. Rockaway Boulevard becomes a six-lane divided road at this point and continues southeast to the Queens-Nassau border, where it splits. One branch continues as Rockaway Turnpike (Nassau County Route 257), and the other leads to the southern part of NY 878. Rockaway Boulevard and Rockaway Turnpike were formerly known as Rockaway Road (or Rockaway Plank Road) and the Jamaica and Rockaway Turnpike. The portion of Rockaway Turnpike in Queens (a separate road towards Jamaica) is now called Sutphin Boulevard.

Parks along Rockaway Boulevard
As Rockaway Boulevard cuts diagonally through the rectangular street grid of southeastern Queens, triangular intersections that were too small to develop were designated as parks. These include Legion Triangle, Dixon Triangle, Lynch Triangle, Ruoff Triangle, Corporal Ruoff Square, Wellbrook Triangle, O'Connell Square, Catholic War Veterans Triangle, and Sergeant Colyer Square. Larger parks along the route include Playground One Forty, Baisley Pond Park, and Idlewild Park.

Transportation
The Rockaway Boulevard station ( train) of the New York City Subway serves the boulevard at the intersection of Cross Bay, Rockaway, and Woodhaven Boulevards.

References

External links
Rockaway & Farmers Boulevards (Jeff Saltzman's Expressway Site)
Triangles of Rockaway Boulevard (Forgotten-NY)

Streets in Queens, New York